A launch pad is an above-ground platform from which rocket- missiles or space launch vehicles take off vertically.

Launch pad may also refer to:

Computing
 Launchpad (macOS), an application launcher introduced in Mac OS X Lion
 Launch Pad (software), an alternative to the Macintosh desktop developed by Berkeley Systems
 Launchpad (website), used for bug tracking and software development mainly used as part of the Ubuntu operating system
 LaunchPad, Clearspring tool that enables web content to be turned into distributable widgets
 Launchpad, U3 software application for USB flash drives
 Launchpad, a hardware controller for the Ableton Live music sequencer software
 Launchpad, a family of hardware development kits for embedded development from Texas Instruments

Other
 Atlanta–Fulton County Stadium, nicknamed The Launching Pad, former stadium used by the Atlanta Braves
 Launch Pad (card game), a game about building rockets and preparing them for launch
Launchpad (series), a collection of short films produced by Walt Disney Pictures
 Launchpad McQuack, a Disney character
 Launchpad Records, a record label
 Launchpad, a charity for the homeless based in Reading, UK, co-founded by David Shaw
 Novation Launchpad, a keyboard-less MIDI controller

See also

 Launch facility
 Launch complex
 Launch Complex (disambiguation)
 Launch (disambiguation)
 Pad (disambiguation)